Llum BCN is an annual light art festival held in Barcelona, Spain. It is celebrated since 2012 every February in Barcelona's neighborhood Poblenou. A selection of outstanding international creators, along with the emerging talent of local art and design artists, feature a series of immersive light installations and shows blurring boundaries between art, science and technology, and showcasing the best of the new creative talent and technology.

Concept
Llum BCN, Light Barcelona in English, takes place in the Poblenou neighborhood, starting at the Design Museum of Barcelona at Plaça de les Glòries Catalanes. The installations are spread across the neighborhood and are visible from nightfall until midnight.
Large historic buildings, old factory chimneys and industrial plants, but also the modern Torre Glòries are transformed into works of art by large-scale projections and audio-visual displays turning the Poblenou neighborhood into a unique world of expressive light and imagery. Many of the festival's light displays include the use of the latest technology, such as virtual reality and AI.

Artists
Llum BCN has featured key artists, such as Rafael Lozano-Hemmer, Julio Le Parc, Luke Jerram, Ulf Langheinrich, United Visual Artists, Kurt Hentschlager, Trevor Paglen, Chila Kumari Burman, Vera Molnár and Catalonia's Antoni Arola as well as local schools of art, design, illumination, and architecture.

Gallery

References

External links
 Official website

Light festivals
Culture in Barcelona
El Poblenou